The Church of Santo Adriano de Tuñón is a Roman Catholic Pre-Romanesque church in the village of Tuñón, Asturias, Spain dedicated to Saint Adrian.

The church is located on the bank of the River Trubia, next to an old Roman road. Founded on January 24, 891, by Alfonso III of Asturias and his wife  Jimena of Navarra as a monastery church, it went through large transformations at the beginnings of the 12th century. It was declared a Spanish national monument in June 1931.

Architecture 
The church stands on a classic basilica ground plan, although in the 17th and 18th centuries it was extended with a nave structure at the western end, and a bell gable.

Decoration 
Mural paintings were rediscovered in the 20th century.
The fresco paintings in this church are the only remains of Mozarabic painters' work in an Asturian art workshop.

See also
Asturian art
Catholic Church in Spain

Notes

References 

 
 
 
 Mªdel Carmen MARQUEZ URIA (1977) Nº 90-91, Sto.Adriano: Las excavaciones del conde de la Vega del Sella, p. 431-446

9th-century churches in Spain
Adriano de Tunon
Bien de Interés Cultural landmarks in Asturias
Religious buildings and structures completed in 891